General elections were held in Botswana on 7 October 1989, alongside local elections. The result was the sixth straight landslide victory for the Botswana Democratic Party (BDP), which won 31 of the 34 elected seats.

As of the 2019 general election, this is the last time the BDP won more than the 60% of the popular vote.

Background
A referendum on electoral reform had been held in 1987, and resulted in the creation of a Supervisor of Elections, which would be appointed by the government. Both the BDP and the Botswana National Front (BNF) hold primary elections to select candidates.

Campaign
The BNF went into the elections suffering from instability; Bathoen Gaseitsiwe resigned as party leader in 1985 after becoming head of the Customary Court of Appeal. Prior to the elections  Bathoen criticised new party leader Kenneth Koma for his left-wing policies, resigned from the BNF and established the Botswana Freedom Party (BFP). The new BFP ran as a nationalist and pro-free market party. The ruling BDP campaigned on its record in government around economic development and political stability.

A total of 91 candidates contested the elections, with the BDP being the only party to field a full slate of 34 candidates. The BNF put forward 31 candidates, the Botswana People's Party 11, the Botswana Independence Party 9, the Botswana Freedom Party 2 and the Botswana Progressive Union and Botswana Liberal Party both had a single candidate.

Results

Aftermath
Following the elections, the BNF claimed that there had been irregularities in the Mochudi constituency, where they lost to the BDP by 29 votes. The High Court ruled in the BNF's favour, resulting in a by-election in June 1990 in which the BDP retained the seat.

References

Elections in Botswana
Bostwana
Election
Election and referendum articles with incomplete results
October 1989 events in Africa